Kal Bhairab may refer to:

 Bhairava, the fierce manifestation of Lord Shiva associated with annihilation
 Kal Bhairab, Nepal, a place in Nepal

See also
 Bhairav (disambiguation)